Monument School is a public school in Monument, Oregon, United States. It is the only school in the Monument School District.

Academics
In 2008, 100% of the school's seniors received a high school diploma. Of five students, five graduated and none dropped out.

References

High schools in Grant County, Oregon
Public high schools in Oregon
Public middle schools in Oregon
Public elementary schools in Oregon